is a Japanese tokusatsu TV show produced by Tsuburaya Productions which aired on the Tokyo Broadcasting System channel from April 2, 1980, to March 25, 1981, lasting a total of 50 episodes. After going off the air in 1981, the network still aired weekly reruns of the show.  It was the ninth TV show in the Ultra Series and began a week after the conclusion of the anime series The Ultraman, bringing the franchise back to its live-action roots. It would be the last Ultraman TV series for Japanese audiences during the following 16 years until the production of Ultraman Tiga.

Plot

Following the end of the 1979-80 anime The Ultraman, Ultraman 80 returns to the setting of the main Showa continuity, taking place after 5 years of peace since the end of Ultraman Leo. A new middle school teacher Takeshi Yamato is actually the disguised Ultra from the Land of Light, Ultraman 80, whose mission is to fight a new wave of monsters resulted from Minus Energy while stabilizing his life as a teacher and UGM member. Although the initial episodes focuses on Takeshi trying to solve the daily problems of his students, starting from episode 13 onward he left the school to join UGM as a full time officer as more members keep appearing one after another in the series progress. Episode 31 returned to the setting of Takeshi interacting with the guest characters of children every week while dealing with appearing monsters and their relation to it. When the princess from the Land of Light Yullian went to Earth as a result of King Galtan's attack, she joined UGM to replace the deceased member Emi Jōno while operating with fellow Ultra Takeshi/80 in dealing against monster attacks. In the season finale, their identities were exposed by Captain Ōyama, who prevented them from participating in the fight against Margodon to prove humankind's reliability in defending the Earth. With their true nature exposed, 80 and Yullian spent their final days on Earth before departing toward the Land of Light, leaving Earth in a 25-year period of peace.

Episodes

Cast
, Ultraman 80 (Voice): 
: 
: 
: 
: 
: 
: 
, : 
: 
, : 
: 
: 
: 
: 
: 
: 
: 
Narrator: ,

Songs
Opening themes

Lyrics: 
Composition & Arrangement: 
Artist: TALIZMAN
Episodes: 1-39

Lyrics: Michio Yamagami
Composition & Arrangement: Noboru Kimura
Artist: TALIZMAN, 
Episodes: 40-50

Ending themes

Lyrics: Michio Yamagami
Composition & Arrangement: Noboru Kimura
Artist: TALIZMAN
Episodes: 1-39

Lyrics: Michio Yamagami
Composition & Arrangement: Noboru Kimura
Artist: TALIZMAN, Columbia Yurikago Kai
Episodes: 40-49

Insert theme

Lyrics: 
Composition: 
Arrangement: 
Artist: 
Episodes: 50

Home media
In 2014, the series was released on Crunchyroll, and later released on the streaming service Toku in 2017.

In July 2020, Shout! Factory announced to have struck a multi-year deal with Alliance Entertainment and Mill Creek Entertainment, with the blessings of Tsuburaya and Indigo, that granted them the exclusive SVOD and AVOD digital rights to the Ultra series and films (1,100 TV episodes and 20 films) acquired by Mill Creek the previous year. Ultraman 80, amongst other titles, will stream in the United States and Canada through Shout! Factory TV and Tokushoutsu.

It was released in the United States on DVD September 14, 2021 by Mill Creek Entertainment.

Other appearances
 Ultraman Story, Ultraman Zoffy: Ultra Warriors vs. the Giant Monster Army and Ultraman vs. Kamen Rider: stock footage appearances
 Ultraman Mebius
 Mega Monster Battle: Ultra Galaxy and Ultraman Zero: The Revenge of Belial: see here
 Ultraman Retsuden
 Ultraman Geed: see here

References

External links

Official website of Tsuburaya Productions 
Ultraman Connection — Official website 
Official Ultraman channel at YouTube

1980 Japanese television series debuts
1981 Japanese television series endings
Ultra television series
Fictional schoolteachers
TBS Television (Japan) original programming
Television duos
Television series about educators